Christian Church of Gilroy is a historic church located at 160 5th Street in Gilroy, California. The church was built in 1857 for Gilroy's congregation of the Christian Church, also known as the Disciples of Christ. The congregation was one of the first of any denomination in Gilroy, and it was the first to build its own church. The Greek Revival church is a rectangular, -story building with a bell tower over the northern entrance. The tower features louvered openings, corner pilasters, and a projecting cornice at the top. The church held the 1859 State Meeting of the Disciples of Christ, which attracted roughly 1,000 attendees. In 1885, the church moved several blocks to its present location.

The church was added to the National Register of Historic Places in 1982.

References

Churches on the National Register of Historic Places in California
Greek Revival church buildings in California
Churches completed in 1857
Churches in Santa Clara County, California
National Register of Historic Places in Santa Clara County, California
Christian Church (Disciples of Christ) congregations
Wooden churches in California
1857 establishments in California